Hervás is a Spanish town in the north of the province of Cáceres. It had 3,839 inhabitants in 2005. It is 120 km from Cáceres and 90 km far from Salamanca. It is the capital of the Valle de Ambroz comarca in the Ambroz River valley. It has a soft continental climate.

History
In the 12th century, the Knights Templar built Santihervás hermitage under the patronage of the Christian martyrs Gervasius and Protasius. By this hermitage the town started to grow during 13th and 14th centuries.

From its foundation on it belonged to the lordship of Béjar in the Kingdom of Castile: it passed to Cáceres jurisdiction on the 30 November 1833.

La Judería
Many Jewish families settled here from the 15th century on, they even maintained their rituals some years after 1492. The Jewish quarter (Judería) has been maintained and it is one of the tourist lures of the town.

Economy
The textile industry was very important from the 18th to 19th centuries. After that, the chestnut wood industry, handicrafts and tourism have been the pillar of Hervás' economy.

Remarkable buildings
 La Enfermería de los Religiosos Franciscanos (Franciscan Sickbay), 18th century, current town hall.
 El Convento de los Religiosos Trinitarios (Trinitarian Convent), current Junta de Extremadura Hospedería (chain of four-star hotels run by the regional government).
 Pérez Comendador-Leroux Museum, 18th century.
 La Iglesia Parroquial de Santa María (Saint Mary's Parish Church).
 Museo de la Cereza del Jerte (cereza con denominación de origen Valle del Jerte). Hospederia Valle del Jerte.
 Plasencia, la perla del Valle del Jerte

References

External links

Hervás City Council website 

Historic Jewish communities in Europe
Municipalities in the Province of Cáceres